Psycho Pinball is a 1994 pinball video game published and developed by Codemasters, released for the Mega Drive in the United Kingdom, and MS-DOS in the United States and Europe.

Gameplay
There are four differently themed tables; Wild West (American Old West), Trick or Treat (Halloween), The Abyss (Caribbean underwater), and finally Psycho (an amusement park). While the first three are regular tables, Psycho broke new ground; it is connected to the others by activating certain jumpers, then launching the ball into one of the tents, and the ball continues in the other table, returning to drop from the tent in Psycho when it drains. It is also the only one with a spring ball launcher and no multiball (presumably because of the potential for one of the balls to transition between tables).

Wild West is an open table with few obstacles; this makes it very difficult to make high scores, unlike Trick or Treat, which is a much more enclosed table, but with more ramp multipliers. The Abyss is the only one with two levels of play, and the multiball is usually reduced to 2 balls. To activate the multiball, the player has to trap a ball in one of the "vents" holes, and then knock it out of its trajectory when it is being thrown from one hole to another. It is possible, although difficult, to trap additional balls in the vents and eventually have more balls in the multiball.

Minigames
One of the main features of the game are the minigames on each table. They range from simple panel games to full arcade sequences, all activated by hitting certain triggers, and then sending the ball to a particular location on the table. Panel games include Blackjack in the Wild West table, Spook Shoot (the player has to hit 20 ghosts which appear in three positions, corresponding to the three joypad buttons, or two flippers and a tilt on the PC) on Trick or Treat, Cup Confusion on Psycho (a shell game to find the letter P under one of three moving cups), or Fast Fishing (pressing the C button when fishes pass by the hook) in The Abyss.

The arcade minigames are much more elaborate and require more effort. The player is in direct control of Psycho, an armadillo, and must reach the bonus plaque.
Runaway Train (in Wild West): Psycho is in the end of a hijacked train, and has to reach the locomotive, dodging through signs, water tanks, gunmen and tunnels. If Psycho falls, is climbing a ladder when trapped at the left side of the screen or gets hit by an obstacle or a bullet, no bonus is awarded.
Moonsquares (in Psycho): Psycho must travel from one rocket to another using disappearing platforms. There is a 5x5 grid composed of platforms that disappear. If Psycho falls, the bonus is progressively reduced until it boots Psycho back to the pinball table.
Whale's Belly (in The Abyss): Psycho is trapped inside a whale, along with three buoys and an endless supply of crabs. Psycho must capture the crabs and throw them into the whales' ulcers, which eventually pop up and fill her stomach with water, allowing Psycho to reach higher. Psycho dies if he takes too much time (which makes the whale burp) or falls into the water.

The Trick or Treat table does not have such an arcade minigame, although early magazine previews show a minigame with brooms that never made into the final game.

Both can be disabled in the options, giving each time the mini games would be activated the full bonus.

None of these arcade minigames exist in the PC version; these three games are replaced by different ones (activated in a practically identical manner), played on the panel.

Dodge the Express (Wild West): Psycho must avoid a series of oncoming trains.
Strong Arm (Psycho): A button masher event to arm wrestle against a circus strongman.
Blubber Belly (The Abyss): stop a selector for one of five game features (extra balls, instant activation of modes, etc.).

It also adds Big Deal, a higher-or-lower card game, to the casino in the Wild West (alternating with Blackjack).

References

1994 video games
Codemasters games
DOS games
Sega Genesis games
Pinball video games
Halloween video games
Western (genre) games
Video games set in North America
Video games set in amusement parks
Video games developed in the United Kingdom
Multiplayer and single-player video games